Clawddnewydd is a village in the community of Derwen, Denbighshire.

The village has a community centre (Canolfan Cae Cymro), a shop (Siop y Fro) and a pub (Glan Llyn) all owned and run by the villagers. Cae Cymro is the name of the field adjoining the community centre, where Clawddnewydd FC play their Llandyrnog and District Summer League home fixtures.

The Clawddnewydd telephone exchange in the village used to have its own area code (08245) until numbers were changed and it became part of the new Ruthin area code (01824). The exchange now services Ruthin area numbers beginning 750 (i.e. 01824 750 XXX), which includes the community of Llanelidan the other side of the A494 road.

References

External links

Old photographs of Clawdewydd

Villages in Denbighshire